The Diocese of Machakos may refer to;

Anglican Diocese of Machakos, in the city of Machakos, Kenya
Roman Catholic Diocese of Machakos, in the city of Machakos, Kenya